Ryazansky (masculine), Ryazanskaya (feminine), or Ryazanskoye (neuter) may refer to:
Ryazansky District, several districts in Russia
Ryazansky (rural locality) (Ryazanskaya, Ryazanskoye), several rural localities in Russia
Ryazan Oblast (Ryazanskaya oblast), a federal subject of Russia